Angels in Stardust is a 2014 American coming-of-age comedy-drama film written and directed by William Robert Carey and starring Alicia Silverstone, AJ Michalka and Billy Burke. The film is Carey's directorial debut, and is based on his own novel Jesus in Cowboy Boots, released in 2013.

It was released in theaters and on video on demand on February 21, 2014. The film was re-released in 2016 under its original title, Jesus in Cowboy Boots. The "Angels in Stardust" title, invented by the first distributor, was designed to put the film at the beginning of the alphabetical pay-per-view lists. Unfortunately, the title was antithetical to the film's story and themes. In 2021, Carey wrote a memoir, How Not to Make a Movie: An Independent Filmmaker in Hollywood Hell, about his trials and tribulations of making the film.

Plot
Vallie Sue Russell, an imaginative small-town girl, living in a dusty Texas community built on an abandoned drive-in movie lot turns to an imaginary friend, The Cowboy, for solace from her self-absorbed mother and the dangerous world around her. A mysterious Native American, Tenkill, and two local lowlifes turn Vallie Sue's world upside down, changing her life forever.

Cast
Alicia Silverstone as Tammy Russell
AJ Michalka as Vallie Sue Russell
Billy Burke as The Cowboy
Amelia Rose Blaire as Loretta
Michael Spears as Tenkill
Jeannetta Arnette as Jacqueline Windsor
Chandler Massey as Angelo
Sierra Fisk as Principal
Dennis Cockrum as Mr. Sunday
Darin Heams as Old Ray
Tyler Riggs as Mickey
Adam Taylor as Pleasant Russell
Kelly Ramel as Francine

References

External links
 
 

2014 films
2010s coming-of-age comedy-drama films
2014 directorial debut films
2014 independent films
American coming-of-age comedy-drama films
American independent films
Films based on American novels
Films shot in California
Films set in Texas
2010s English-language films
2010s American films